is a Japanese footballer currently playing as a defender for SC Sagamihara from 2023.

Career statistics

Club
.

Notes

References

External links

1998 births
Living people
People from Saitama Prefecture
Hosei University alumni
Japanese footballers
Association football defenders
J3 League players
Fukushima United FC players
SC Sagamihara players